John Hoge (September 10, 1760August 4, 1824) was a member of the United States House of Representatives from Pennsylvania.

Biography
Hoge was born near Hogestown in the Province of Pennsylvania. He served in the Revolutionary War as ensign in the Ninth Pennsylvania Regiment. In 1782 he moved to what is now Washington, Pennsylvania, which he and his brother, William Hoge, founded. He was a delegate to the State constitutional convention in 1790, and a member of the Pennsylvania State Senate from 1790 to 1795.

Hoge was elected as a Republican to the Eighth Congress to fill the vacancy caused by the resignation of his brother, William Hoge. In 1791, he was elected to the American Philosophical Society. He died at Meadow Lands, Pennsylvania in 1824, and is buried in Washington Cemetery at Washington, Pennsylvania.

References

 

1760 births
1824 deaths
Pennsylvania state senators
People from Washington, Pennsylvania
Politicians from Pittsburgh
People from Cumberland County, Pennsylvania
American city founders
Democratic-Republican Party members of the United States House of Representatives from Pennsylvania
18th-century American politicians
19th-century American politicians
Continental Army officers from Pennsylvania